Milan Dvorščík (born 7 March 1970) is a Slovak former racing cyclist. A professional from 1998 to 1999, he notably won the Tour of Yugoslavia in 1999. He also won a silver medal in the amateur road race at the 1994 UCI Road World Championships.

He participated in the 1996 and 2000 Summer Olympics, representing Slovakia.

Major results

1987
 1st  Overall Tour du Pays de Vaud
1st Stage 3
1988
 1st Stage 3 Tour du Pays de Vaud
1990
 2nd Overall Okolo Slovenska
1994
 2nd Amateur road race, World Road Championships
1999
 1st  Overall Tour of Yugoslavia
1st Stages 1 & 2
 1st Prologue Tour du Faso
 3rd Overall Tour de Serbie
2000
 1st Stage 6 Tour of South China Sea

References

External links
 

1970 births
Living people
Slovak male cyclists
Cyclists at the 1996 Summer Olympics
Cyclists at the 2000 Summer Olympics
Olympic cyclists of Slovakia
Sportspeople from Považská Bystrica
20th-century Slovak people
21st-century Slovak people